Lorenzo Colombo (born 8 March 2002) is an Italian professional footballer who plays as a forward for  club Lecce, on loan from AC Milan.

Club career 
Born in Vimercate, close to Milan, Colombo is a product of the youth academy of AC Milan. His goal tally in the club's youth teams led to him making his debut for the Primavera (under-19) side at the age of 15. Due to minor injuries, his time in the Primavera was cut short.

Due to the COVID-19 pandemic in 2020, the Milan first team's lack of striking options meant they were unable to cope with the busy schedule after football resumed, and Colombo was promoted to the senior side. He made his first-team debut, aged 18, on 12 June 2020, replacing Lucas Paquetá after 82 minutes in a 0−0 draw at home to Juventus in the Coppa Italia. He made his Serie A debut in a 5−1 home win against Bologna on 18 July 2020.

On 5 September 2020, he scored his first senior goal in a 4–1 win against Monza in a friendly match. On 24 September 2020, he scored his first goal in official competition, during a Europa League match against Norwegian club FK Bodø/Glimt.

On 26 January 2021, Colombo joined Serie B club Cremonese on a six-month loan, until the end of the season.

On 31 July 2021, Colombo was sent to Serie B club SPAL on a one-year loan.

On 7 July 2022, Colombo joined recently promoted Serie A club Lecce on a one-year loan, with an option to be signed permanently.

International career 
Colombo played for the Italy U17 and the Italy U19 side.

He made his debut with the Italy U21 on 30 March 2021, playing as a substitute during the group stage match of the 2021 UEFA European Under-21 Championship won 4–0 against Slovenia in Maribor.

Career statistics

References 

2002 births
Living people
People from Vimercate
Association football forwards
Italian footballers
Italy youth international footballers
A.C. Milan players
S.P.A.L. players
U.S. Cremonese players
U.S. Lecce players
Serie A players
Serie B players
Footballers from Lombardy
Sportspeople from the Province of Monza e Brianza